Richard Lasater (born October 6, 1965) is an American former stock car racing driver and crew chief. Lasater competed in 80 NASCAR Busch Series (now NASCAR Xfinity Series) races between 1990 and 1994, reaching the top ten twice. He served as crew chief in the NASCAR Busch Series for drivers Tim Fedewa and Kevin Lepage.

References 

Living people
1965 births
NASCAR crew chiefs